Captain Jeremiah Halpern (also known as Yirmiyahu Halpern and Yirmiyahu Halperin) (b. Smolensk, Russia, 1901; d. Tel Aviv, Israel, 1962) was a Revisionist Zionist leader in Palestine who first came to prominence when he served as aide de camp to Ze'ev Jabotinsky in the 1920s when the latter was head of the Haganah in Jerusalem.

Halpern, a certified ship's captain, was known as Rav Hahovel (captain of the ship) for his role in the development of Jewish seamanship.

Family
Jeremiah Halpern was the son of Michael Halpern (Y'hiel Mikhael Halpern; Yekhiel Michal Halperin) descendant of a wealthy rabbinical family from Vilnius, Lithuania, who is now known mainly as the first proponent of a Jewish Legion. Michael emigrated to Palestine from Smolensk in 1885 and was involved in setting up Jewish colonies on land bought from Arabs, in founding the first Hebrew workers' union and in helping to found the Workers of Zion movement and the Jewish self-defense force in 1905.

Jeremiah was brought to Palestine in 1913.

Education and career

Jeremiah Halpern was educated at the Herzliya Hebrew Gymnasium in Tel Aviv and following his high school education graduated as a captain from the Italian Naval Academy in 1917. In 1919 he graduated from the London School for Captains and Engineers, becoming an apprentice sailor on the Jewish ship Hechalutz in the same year.
Halpern assisted in the defence of Jews of the Old City of Jerusalem during the 1920 Palestine riots. Subsequently, he was a leader of Betar, the Revisionist youth movement, and headed the Betar School of Instruction. On taking up permanent residence in Palestine in 1933 Halpern was associated primarily with the Hebrew Committee of National Liberation. He was also in charge of military training for the World Betar movement.

In later years he was associated with the Irgun underground group in Palestine and Europe, undertook various Revisionist missions to the United States between 1939 and 1941 and was active in Hillel Kook's Bergson Group.

In the early 1940s Halpern worked with Lord Stabolgi to achieve the objectives of Bergson's Committee for a Jewish Army, a campaign which was endorsed enthusiastically by the Jewish Chronicle, but which antagonised the Zionist establishment because of its association with Jabotinsky's New Zionist Organization.

The Training School for Betar Instructors

Halepern established the Training School for Betar Instructors (or Betar 'madricihim,' also often translated as 'youth guides' or 'youth leaders') in Tel Aviv in 1928, serving as its first director. Halpern recruited Abba Ahimeir as an instructor of the nationalist youth and together the pair led the School in an increasingly radical direction in which military training was viewed as a means of establishing the military wing of a national liberation movement.

Under the leadership of Halpern (and later of Ahimeir) the 24 cadets took the lead in organising demonstrative activities outside Betar, which notably included taking the initiative in the march to the Western Wall in August 1929.

Halpern's cadets later formed the nucleus for the right-wing Maximalist tendency in Revisionism and the activities of Halpern and Ahimeir contributed to the evolution of the Irgun and to the support of Revisionist Maximalism within Betar.

1929 Riots in Palestine
On 15 August, the Jewish fast of Tisha B'Av, three hundred Revisionist youths from the Battalion for the Defence of the Language and Betar, who were led by Halpern, marched to the Western Wall proclaiming "The Wall is ours". The protesters raised the Zionist flag and sang the Hatikvah and were said to have insulted the Prophet, Islam, and the Muslim community at large, and also to have beaten up Muslim residents. The demonstration took place in the Muslim Maghribi district in front of the Mufti's house.

Two days later, in raised tensions caused by a 2000-strong Muslim counter-demonstration after Friday prayers the day before, a Jewish youth, Avraham Mizrahi, was killed and an Arab youth picked at random was stabbed in retaliation. Subsequently, the violence escalated into rioting throughout Palestine.

The demonstration by Revisionist youth of 15 August was later identified as the proximal cause of the riots by the Shaw Commission.

The Brit HaHayal

Halpern was world commander of the Brit HaHayal, a Revisionist association of Jewish reservists in the Polish Army that grew into a world organisation with regional military and political training schools for members.

By 1939 Brit HaHayal had 25,000 members worldwide.

The Betar Naval Academy

Under the direction of Jabotinsky the Betar Naval Academy was established in Civitavecchia, Italy in 1934. The titular head was the Italian maritime scientist Nicola Fusco but Jeremiah Halpern ran the School and was its driving force. The School trained cadets from all over Europe, Palestine and South Africa and produced some of the future commanders of the Israeli Navy.

Although the Revisionists were keen to ensure that trainees avoided local Fascist politics the cadets did express public support for Benito Mussolini's regime, as Halpern later detailed in his book History of Hebrew Seamanship. Cadets marched alongside Italian soldiers in support of the Second Italo–Abyssinian War and collected metal scraps for the Italian weapons industry.  They "felt as if they were living the true Beitarist life in an atmosphere of herosim, militarism, and nationalistic pride."

The Academy closed in 1938.

World War II

At the outbreak of World War II Halpern was sent to negotiate with the Canadian Admiralty for the establishment of a Jewish Naval School to train members of a special Jewish unit for the British Army.

In 1942 Halpern opened a school for frogmen in France, established a school for skipper cadets in London and was successful in attracting support from British officers and members of the Rothschild family. Around 350 officers, mechanics and fishermen graduated from these schools.

Post-war activities

Halpern returned to Israel in 1948 and lived in Eilat, where he studied oceanography and founded the Eilat Naval Museum, which was subsequently named after him.

In 1951 Halpern proposed to David Ben-Gurion to re-organise the Israeli commercial and military Marine Corps and to establish a research programme to explore the natural resources of the Red Sea.

In 1959 Halpern proposed an Eliat Canal as an alternative to the Suez Canal.

Halpern wrote a number of books, including Tĕḥiyat ha-yamaʼut ha-ʻIvrit (1960) and Avi, Mikhaʼel Helpern (1964).

Commemoration
Halpern's contribution to Hebrew seamanship is commemorated by a research scholarship offered by the University of Haifa's Department of Maritime Civilizations.

In addition to the scholarship the Halpern Foundation funded a research boat, the RV Halpern (launched September, 2005), for faculty members and students of the Leon Recanati Institute for Maritime Studies at the University of Haifa.

See also
Pro–Wailing Wall Committee
1929 Palestine riots

Notes

References
Cesarani, David (1994). The Jewish Chronicle and Anglo-Jewry, 1841-1991. Cambridge University Press. 
Dieckhoff, Alain (2003). The Invention of a Nation: Zionist Thought and the Making of Modern Israel. C. Hurst. 
Eisenberg, Ronald L. (2006). The Streets of Jerusalem: Who, What, Why. Devora Publishing. 
Falk, Avner (1996). A Psychoanalytic History of the Jews. Fairleigh Dickinson University Press. 
Kaplan, Eric (2005).The Jewish Radical Right: Revisionist Zionism and Its Ideological Legacy. University of Wisconsin Press. 
Krämer, Gudrun (2008). A History of Palestine: From the Ottoman Conquest to the Founding of the State of Israel. Princeton University Press. 
Laqueur, Walter (2003) A History of Zionism. Schocken Books.
Levine, Daniel (1991). The Birth of the Irgun Zvai Leumi: a Jewish Liberation Movement. Gefen Pub. House. 
Mattar, Philip (1988). The Mufti of Jerusalem: Al-Hajj Amin Al-Husayni and the Palestinian National Movement. Columbia University Press. 
Medoff, Rafael (1987). The Deafening Silence. Shapolsky Publishers. 
Morrison, David (1995). Heroes, Antiheroes, and the Holocaust: American Jewry and Historical Choice. Milah Press. 
Patai, Raphael (1971). Encyclopedia of Zionism and Israel, Volume 1. Herzl Press.
Segev, Tom (2000). One Palestine Complete: Jews and Arabs Under the British Mandate. Abacus. 
Shindler, Colin (2006). The Triumph of Military Zionism: Nationalism and the Origins of the Israeli Right. I B Tauris & Co Ltd. 
Sicker, Martin (2000). Pangs of the Messiah: The Troubled Birth of the Jewish State. Greenwood. 

1901 births
1962 deaths
People from Smolensk
Jews from the Russian Empire
Zionists from the Russian Empire
Jews in Mandatory Palestine
Emigrants from the Russian Empire to the Ottoman Empire
Betar members
Irgun members
20th-century Israeli Jews
Sea captains
Israeli sailors
Burials at Nahalat Yitzhak Cemetery